Purkinje cells, or Purkinje neurons, are a class of GABAergic inhibitory neurons located in the cerebellum. They are named after their discoverer, Czech anatomist Jan Evangelista Purkyně, who characterized the cells in 1839.

Structure

These cells are some of the largest neurons in the human brain (Betz cells being the largest), with an intricately elaborate dendritic arbor, characterized by a large number of dendritic spines. Purkinje cells are found within the Purkinje layer in the cerebellum. Purkinje cells are aligned like dominos stacked one in front of the other. Their large dendritic arbors form nearly two-dimensional layers through which parallel fibers from the deeper-layers pass. These parallel fibers make relatively weaker excitatory (glutamatergic) synapses to spines in the Purkinje cell dendrite, whereas climbing fibers originating from the inferior olivary nucleus in the medulla provide very powerful excitatory input to the proximal dendrites and cell soma. Parallel fibers pass orthogonally through the Purkinje neuron's dendritic arbor, with up to 200,000 parallel fibers forming a Granule-cell-Purkinje-cell synapse with a single Purkinje cell. Each Purkinje cell receives approximately 500 climbing fiber synapses, all originating from a single climbing fiber. Both basket and stellate cells (found in the cerebellar molecular layer) provide inhibitory (GABAergic) input to the Purkinje cell, with basket cells synapsing on the Purkinje cell axon initial segment and stellate cells onto the dendrites.

Purkinje cells send inhibitory projections to the deep cerebellar nuclei, and constitute the sole output of all motor coordination in the cerebellar cortex.

Molecular
The Purkinje layer of the cerebellum, which contains the cell bodies of the Purkinje cells and Bergmann glia, express a large number of unique genes. Purkinje-specific gene markers were also proposed by comparing the transcriptome of Purkinje-deficient mice with that of wild-type mice. One illustrative example is the Purkinje cell protein 4 (PCP4) in knockout mice, which exhibit impaired locomotor learning and markedly altered synaptic plasticity in Purkinje neurons. PCP4 accelerates both the association and dissociation of calcium (Ca2+) with calmodulin (CaM) in the cytoplasm of Purkinje cells, and its absence impairs the physiology of these neurons.

Development

Mammalian embryonic research has detailed the neurogenic origins of Purkinje cells. During early development Purkinje cells arise in the ventricular zone in the neural tube, the nervous system´s precursor in the embryo. All cerebellar neurons derive from germinal neuroepithelia from the ventricular zone. Purkinje cells are specifically generated from progenitors in the ventricular neuroepithelium of the embryonic cerebellar primordium. The first cells generated from the cerebellar primordium form a cap over a diamond-shaped cavity of the developing brain called the fourth ventricle forming the two cerebellar hemispheres. The Purkinje cells that develop later are those of the cerebellum's center-lying section called the vermis. They develop in the cerebellar primordium that covers the fourth ventricle and below a fissure-like region called the isthmus of the developing brain. Purkinje cells migrate toward the outer surface of the cerebellar cortex and form the Purkinje cell layer.

Purkinje cells are born during the earliest stages of cerebellar neurogenesis. Neurogenin2, together with neurogenin1, are transiently expressed in restricted domains of the ventricular neuroepithelium during the time-window of Purkinje cell genesis. This spatio-temporal distribution pattern suggests that neurogenins are involved in the specification of phenotypically heterogeneous Purkinje cell subsets, ultimately responsible for constructing the framework of the cerebellar topography.

There is evidence in mice and humans that bone marrow cells either fuse with or generate cerebellar Purkinje cells, and it is possible that bone marrow cells, either by direct generation or by cell fusion, could play a role in repair of central nervous system damage. Further evidence points yet towards the possibility of a common stem cell ancestor among Purkinje neurons, B-lymphocytes and aldosterone-producing cells of the human adrenal cortex.

Function 

Purkinje cells show two distinct forms of electrophysiological activity:

 Simple spikes occur at rates of 17 – 150 Hz (Raman and Bean, 1999), either spontaneously or when Purkinje cells are activated synaptically by the parallel fibers, the axons of the granule cells.
 Complex spikes are slow, 1–3 Hz spikes, characterized by an initial prolonged large-amplitude spike, followed by a high-frequency burst of smaller-amplitude action potentials. They are caused by climbing fiber activation and can involve the generation of calcium-mediated action potentials in the dendrites.  Following complex spike activity, simple spikes can be suppressed by the powerful complex spike input.

Purkinje cells show spontaneous electrophysiological activity in the form of trains of spikes both sodium-dependent and calcium-dependent. This was initially shown by Rodolfo Llinas (Llinas and Hess (1977) and Llinas and Sugimori (1980)). P-type calcium channels were named after Purkinje cells, where they were initially encountered (Llinas et al. 1989), which are crucial in cerebellar function. Activation of the Purkinje cell by climbing fibers can shift its activity from a quiet state to a spontaneously active state and vice versa, serving as a kind of toggle switch. These findings have been challenged by a study suggesting that such toggling by climbing-fiber inputs occurs predominantly in anaesthetized animals and that Purkinje cells in awake behaving animals, in general, operate almost continuously in the upstate. But this latter study has itself been challenged and Purkinje cell toggling has since been observed in awake cats. A computational model of the Purkinje cell has shown intracellular calcium computations to be responsible for toggling.

Findings have suggested that Purkinje cell dendrites release endocannabinoids that can transiently downregulate both excitatory and inhibitory synapses. The intrinsic activity mode of Purkinje cells is set and controlled by the sodium-potassium pump. This suggests that the pump might not be simply a homeostatic, "housekeeping" molecule for ionic gradients. Instead, it could be a computation element in the cerebellum and the brain. Indeed, a mutation in the - pump causes rapid onset dystonia parkinsonism; its symptoms indicate that it is a pathology of cerebellar computation. 
Furthermore, using the poison ouabain to block - pumps in the cerebellum of a live mouse induces ataxia and dystonia. Numerical modeling of experimental data suggests that, in vivo, the - pump produces long quiescent punctuations (>> 1 s) to Purkinje neuron firing; these may have a computational role. Alcohol inhibits - pumps in the cerebellum and this is likely how it corrupts cerebellar computation and body co-ordination.

Clinical significance

In humans, Purkinje cells can be harmed by a variety of causes: toxic exposure, e.g. to alcohol or lithium; autoimmune diseases; genetic mutations causing spinocerebellar ataxias, gluten ataxia, Unverricht-Lundborg disease, or autism; and neurodegenerative diseases that are not known to have a genetic basis, such as the cerebellar type of multiple system atrophy or sporadic ataxias.

Gluten ataxia is an autoimmune disease triggered by the ingestion of gluten. The death of Purkinje cells as a result of gluten exposure is irreversible. Early diagnosis and treatment with a gluten-free diet can improve ataxia and prevent its progression. Less than 10% of people with gluten ataxia present any gastrointestinal symptom, yet about 40% have intestinal damage. It accounts for 40% of ataxias of unknown origin and 15% of all ataxias.

The neurodegenerative disease spinocerebellar ataxia type 1 (SCA1) is caused by an unstable polyglutamine expansion within the Ataxin 1 protein. This defect in Ataxin 1 protein causes impairment of mitochondria in Purkinje cells, leading to premature degeneration of the Purkinje cells. As a consequence, motor coordination declines and eventually death ensues.

Some domestic animals can develop a condition where the Purkinje cells begin to atrophy shortly after birth, called cerebellar abiotrophy. It can lead to symptoms such as ataxia, intention tremors, hyperreactivity, lack of menace reflex, stiff or high-stepping gait, apparent lack of awareness of foot position (sometimes standing or walking with a foot knuckled over), and a general inability to determine space and distance.  A similar condition known as cerebellar hypoplasia occurs when Purkinje cells fail to develop in utero or die off before birth.

The genetic conditions ataxia telangiectasia and Niemann Pick disease type C, as well as cerebellar essential tremor, involve the progressive loss of Purkinje cells.
In Alzheimer's disease, spinal pathology is sometimes seen, as well as loss of dendritic branches of the Purkinje cells. Purkinje cells can also be damaged by the rabies virus as it migrates from the site of infection in the periphery to the central nervous system.

Etymology

Purkinje cells are named after the Czech scientist Jan Evangelista Purkyně, who discovered them in 1839.

References

External links
Cell Image Library - Purkinje
Disorders of cerebellum
NIF Search - Purkinje Cell via the Neuroscience Information Framework

Further reading
 
 
 
 

Neurons
Cerebellum
Central nervous system neurons